Atelopus subornatus is a species of toad in the family Bufonidae. It is endemic to Colombia and is restricted to the Cordillera Oriental in the Cundinamarca Department. Common name Bogota stubfoot toad has been coined for this species.

Description
The body is relatively slim. The head is as wide as long. The fingers have only some basal webbing whereas the toes are heavily webbed. The dorsum is dark red-brown, turning to yellowish or greenish on the sides.

Breeding
Atelopus subornatus breeds in streams. Some jelly capsules are empty. The egg strings are not adherent but sink to the stream bottom and get caught by obstructions. The tadpoles are boldly marked with cream and black.

Habitat and conservation
Breeding takes place in streams. It is threatened by chytridiomycosis as well as habitat loss caused by agricultural expansion and water pollution from pig farms.

References

subornatus
Endemic fauna of Colombia
Amphibians of Colombia
Amphibians of the Andes
Amphibians described in 1899
Taxa named by Franz Werner
Taxonomy articles created by Polbot